Roberts may refer to:

People 
 Roberts (given name), a Latvian masculine given name
 Roberts (surname), a popular surname, especially among the Welsh

Places 
 Roberts (crater), a lunar impact crater on the far side of the Moon

United States
 Roberts, Idaho
 Roberts, Illinois
 Roberts, Indiana
 Roberts, West Virginia
 Roberts, Wisconsin
 Roberts County, South Dakota
 Roberts County, Texas
 Mount Roberts (New Hampshire), a summit in the Ossipee Mountains

Facilities and structures
 The old name of Brandeis/Roberts (MBTA station)
 Roberts Stadium (disambiguation)

Other uses 
 Roberts class monitor, a class of British warship
 USS Samuel B. Roberts (FFG-58), a U.S. Navy frigate
 Roberts Cycles, a cycle manufacturer (also known as Chas. Roberts)
 Roberts Radio, a radio manufacturer
 .257 Roberts, a medium-powered .25 caliber cartridge
 Roberts (company), a Swedish soft drinks manufacturer

See also 

 
 
 Strebor, a lock manufacturer (Roberts spelled backwards)
 Trebor (disambiguation)
 Robertson (disambiguation)
 Robert (disambiguation)
 Robarts (disambiguation)
 Les Roberts (disambiguation)